The World Figure Skating Championships is an annual figure skating competition sanctioned by the International Skating Union in which figure skaters compete for the title of World Champion.

Men's and pairs' competitions took place from February 28 to 29 in Paris, France. Ladies' competitions took place from February 21 to 22 also in Paris, France.

Results

Men

Judges:
 Mr. Fritz Schober 
 Mr. Rudolf Kaler 
 Mr. Charles Rotch 
 Mr. Louis Barbey 
 Mr. Kenneth Dundas

Ladies

Judges:
 Mr. Charles Rotch 
 Mr. W. Bowhill 
 Mr. Wilhelm Bayerle 
 Mr. B. Börjeson 
 Mr. Fernand de Montigny 
 Mr. Fritz Schober 
 Mr. Charles Sabouret

Pairs

Judges:
 Mr. Fritz Schober 
 Mr. Hans Grünauer 
 Mr. Charles Sabouret 
 Mr. Kenneth Dundas 
 Mr. Charles Rotch

Sources
 Result List provided by the ISU

World Figure Skating Championships
World Figure Skating Championships
International figure skating competitions hosted by France
1936 in French sport
1936 in Paris
February 1936 sports events
International sports competitions hosted by Paris